is a Japanese manga series written and illustrated by Tsuya Tsuya. It was serialized in Shōnen Gahōsha's Young Comic magazine from August 2016 to April 2019.

Publication
Shōnen Gahōsha collected its chapters in four tankōbon volumes, released from May 30, 2017, to May 30, 2019.

Volume list

See also
Mikazuki ga Waratteru, another manga series by the same author
Rakujitsu no Pathos, another manga series by the same author
Shiori's Diary, another manga series by the same author

References

Erotic romance anime and manga
Seinen manga
Shōnen Gahōsha manga